The Deputy Prime Minister of Pakistan, officially the Deputy Prime Minister of the Islamic Republic of Pakistan was the second most senior minister of the Republic of the Government of Pakistan.  The main purpose of the post was to give a backup to the government in the absence of the Prime Minister. As a result of an agreement between the ruling Pakistan Peoples Party (PPP) and the PML-Q to share ministries in the federal cabinet, Chaudhry Pervaiz Elahi was made the first Deputy Prime Minister of Pakistan. Since 2013, the office has been vacant.

Deputy Prime Minister of Pakistan

History
Nusrat Bhutto served as Deputy Prime Minister of Pakistan in her daughter's cabinet. Before that Z.A.Bhutto served as the first deputy prime minister of Pakistan in Nurul Amin's regime.

Powers and responsibilities
The post is symbolic, non-constitutional and without specific authorities, created only to ceremonially protect the space of the Prime Minister in his/her absence. The post does not carry particular responsibilities, although it is granted oversight over a number of ministries in the cabinet and the Deputy Prime Minister works in his/her capacity as a "Senior federal minister". Chaudhry Pervaiz Elahi had worked as a Senior minister in the cabinet of former Prime Minister Yousuf Raza Gilani, another post without any reasonable powers. Previously, the Senior minister post was occupied by Begum Nusrat Bhutto and Chaudhry Nisar Ali Khan, in the governments of Benazir Bhutto and Nawaz Sharif, respectively.

Inaugural Office
On 25 June 2012, Chaudhry Pervez Elahi was appointed as the first Deputy Prime Minister of Pakistan. He also holds different offices in the federal cabinet. The post, for which there is nonconstitutional provision, was a result of the agreement between the Government and PML-Q leadership. The notification described that Elahi's appointment was carried out on immediate basis and will be valid until a new order is issued. The notification further stated that "Elahi will not possess the powers of the prime minister".

Judiciary issues 
On 28 June 2012, a petition was filed in the Supreme Court of Pakistan against the validity of the post. The petitioner told the court there is no space for any such position in the Constitution of Pakistan and insisted the court to dismiss the post. The post was also challenged in the Lahore High Court under the violation to the article 91 of the constitution. The petitioner appealed the court that "this appointment was ill-intended and should be declared void." A petition was also filed in the Sindh High Court which was rejected by the court.

See also
 Vice President of Pakistan

References

External links
 Government of Pakistan

Politics of Pakistan
National Assembly of Pakistan
 
Continuity of government in Pakistan